The Czartoryski coat of arms is a Polish–Lithuanian coat of arms, a variant of the Pogoń Litewska arms. It has been used by the Gediminid Czartoryski family.

History

Blazon
There arms are a modified version of Pogoń Litewska, with three towers added at the lower part and the rest remaining identical.

Notable bearers
Notable bearers of this coat of arms include:

 House of Czartoryski
  Adam Jerzy Czartoryski
  Adam Kazimierz Czartoryski
  August Aleksander Czartoryski
  Antonina Czartoryska
  Michal Fryderyk Czartoryski
  Konstancja Czartoryska
  Elzbieta Czartoryska
  Kazimierz Czartoryski
  Konstanty Adam Czartoryski
  Władysław Czartoryski
  Tamara Laura Czartoryska
 House of Sanguszko

See also
 Polish heraldry
 Heraldic family
 List of Polish nobility coats of arms

Gallery

Related coat of arms
 Pogoń Litewska
 Pobóg

Bibliography
 Tadeusz Gajl: Herbarz polski od średniowiecza do XX wieku : ponad 4500 herbów szlacheckich 37 tysięcy nazwisk 55 tysięcy rodów. L&L, 2007. .
 Enterprise Joint Stock Company Michał Rutkowski LLC, documentation. Governmental citizenship.

References

Polish coats of arms